Ganj-e-Shaheedan Mosque is located in Varanasi, Uttar Pradesh, India. This Masjid was built 1034 AD when defeated Muslim soldiers of Ghazi Saiyyad Salar Masud army settled near Varanasi.

See also
 Alamgiri Mosque
 Ghazi Saiyyad Salar Masud
 Chaukhamba Mosque

Mughal mosques
Mosques in Uttar Pradesh
Tourist attractions in Varanasi
Islamic rule in the Indian subcontinent
Religion in Varanasi
Religious buildings and structures completed in 1034
11th-century mosques